Edmilson Junior Paulo da Silva (born 19 August 1994), commonly known as Edmilson, is a Belgian footballer who plays as a winger for Qatari club Al-Duhail.

Career
On 22 August 2012, Edmilson made his debut for Sint-Truiden in the Belgian Second Division as an 81st-minute substitute in the 3–1 win over KV Oostende.
His first goal for the club came later that year in November, during the Belgian Cup tie against KVC Westerlo which ended 5–5. Sint-Truiden won the tie on penalties. On 6 January 2016, after making 87 appearances and scoring 9 goals for Sint-Truiden, Edmilson left to rejoin former club Standard Liège where he made a reunion with former Sint-Truiden manager Yannick Ferrera. He signed a three-year contract.

On 17 March 2018 he played as Standard Liège beat  Genk 1–0 in extra time to win the 2018 Belgian Cup Final and qualify for the UEFA Europa League.

On 22 July 2018, he announced that would leave the club, and play for Qatari club Al-Duhail SC.

Personal life
Edmilson Junior's father, Edmilson, is a Brazilian former footballer who played for Standard Liège and Seraing in Belgium in the 1990s.

Career statistics

Honours
Sint-Truiden
Belgian Second Division: 2014–15

Standard
Belgian Cup: 2015–16, 2017–18

Al-Duhail 
Qatar Emir Cup: 2019, 2022
Qatar Stars League: 2019–20

References

External links
 Player profile at Sint-Truiden Website
 
 

1994 births
Living people
Footballers from Liège
Association football wingers
Belgian footballers
Brazilian footballers
Belgian people of Brazilian descent
Standard Liège players
Sint-Truidense V.V. players
Al-Duhail SC players
Belgian Pro League players
Challenger Pro League players
Qatar Stars League players
Expatriate footballers in Qatar
Belgian expatriate sportspeople in Qatar